Attix5 in computing, is an online disk-to-disk backup solution. Attix5 is one of the oldest managed online backup companies, powering SMBs and enterprises.

On September 11, 2015, Attix5 was acquired by UK based cloud data management company Redstor. Redstor has since renamed the technology Redstor Pro.

See also
List of backup software
Remote backup service
Timeline of computing

References

Online backup services